J. Paul Tardif (February 18, 1908 – August 3, 1998) was an Ontario businessman and political figure. He represented Russell in the House of Commons of Canada as a Liberal from 1959 to 1968.

He was born in Ottawa in 1908, the son of A.-T. Tardif and Marie Côté. In 1933, Tardif married Cecile-H. Quesnel. Tardif served as school commissioner, a member of Ottawa city council, city controller and deputy mayor. He was first elected to parliament in a 1959 by-election held after the death of Joseph-Omer Gour. After his term in office, Tardif served ten years as a citizenship court judge.

References 
 Histoire des Comtes Unis de Prescott et de Russell, L.  Brault (1963)

External links 
 
Edited Hansard - Number 128

1908 births
1998 deaths
Businesspeople from Ottawa
Liberal Party of Canada MPs
Members of the House of Commons of Canada from Ontario
Franco-Ontarian people
Ottawa city councillors
Ottawa controllers